Amolops mantzorum, commonly known as the Sichuan torrent frog or Kangting sucker frog, is a species of frog in the family Ranidae. It is found in Gansu, Sichuan, and Yunnan Provinces of China.  It has recently been reported also from Bhutan.

Amolops mantzorum is an abundant species found in large streams and small rivers, in forest and shrubland. Male frogs measure  and females frogs  in snout–vent length.

References

mantzorum
Amphibians of Bhutan
Frogs of China
Taxa named by Armand David
Amphibians described in 1872
Taxonomy articles created by Polbot